Envelope journalism (also envelopmental journalism, red envelope journalism, white envelope journalism, Ch'ongi, wartawan amplop) is a colloquial term for the practice of bribing corrupt journalists for favorable media coverage.

The term brown envelope journalism is common in English-speaking countries; other envelope colors are more commonly used in Asia, the Philippines, China, Korea, India, and Indonesia.

The term arose from the envelopes used to hold cash bribes, given ostensibly as tokens of appreciation for attending a press conference.

More recently, the term ATM journalism has arisen, to indicate the change to electronic transfer of bribes to journalists' bank accounts.

References

Journalism ethics